Subhash Chandra Baheria is an Indian politician and a three-term Member of Parliament elected to Lok Sabha in 1996, 2014 and 2019 from Bhilwara in Rajasthan as a candidate of Bharatiya Janata Party. He was also MLA from same constituency elected in 2003. Born in 1956, he is a chartered accountant and businessman, his business name is Swastika, which is one of the biggest clothing units of Bhilwara.

References

1956 births
Living people
India MPs 1996–1997
People from Bhilwara district
Indian accountants
Lok Sabha members from Rajasthan
India MPs 2014–2019
Bharatiya Janata Party politicians from Rajasthan
India MPs 2019–present